Karl-Markus Gauß (born 14 May 1954, in Salzburg) is an Austrian contemporary writer, essayist and editor. He lives in Salzburg.

Biography 
Gauß has a degree for German Philology and History from the University of Salzburg. He very early published literary essays, primarily in the magazine Wiener Tagebuch (Viennese Diary). Since 1991, Gauß is editor in chief of the literary magazine Literatur und Kritik, published by the Salzburg publishing house Otto Müller Verlag. In addition, he writes articles and essays for Austrian, German and Swiss newspapers and magazines, such as Die Zeit, Frankfurter Allgemeine Zeitung, Neue Zürcher Zeitung, Salzburger Nachrichten, and Die Presse. In 2006, Karl-Markus Gauß was accepted as member of the German Academy of Language and Poetry.

Works 
Primarily, Karl-Markus Gauß writes essays. One of his main topics are ethnic minorities, some of which aren't sometimes known to the readers even by their name, such as the Aromanians, Roma, Arbëreshë and the Sephardim. Other important topics are Central and South Eastern Europe. Gauß visited these countries on several occasions, usually jointly with the photographer Kurt Kaindl.

His cultural reports and essays describe cultural encounters and intellectual exchanges with the writers of those countries, but also with people "like me and you", on the streets and in pubs. Gauß uses his books very often to present and promote writers from Central and Eastern Europe, who are relatively unknown in Austria and Germany.

Literary prizes and awards 
1987 International Prize of Portorož for Essays
1988 State Subsidy for Literature by the Austrian Department of Education and Cultural Affairs
1989 Buchprämie des Bundesministeriums für Unterricht und Kunst
1992 Subsidy for Literature by the City of Salzburg
1994 Buchprämie des Bundesministeriums für Unterricht und Kunst
1994 Österreichischer Staatspreis für Kulturpublizistik
1997 European Essay Prize Charles Veillon for Das Europäische Alphabet
1998 Bruno-Kreisky-Preis for the Political Book for Ins unentdeckte Österreich
2001 Award of the Austrian Book Sellers for Tolerant Thinking and Acting
2004 René-Marcic-Preis
2005 Manès-Sperber-Preis Vienna
2005 Vilenica International Literary Prize
2006 Georg Dehio Book Prize
2007 Honorary doctorate in philosophy from Salzburg University
2007 Mitteleuropa-Preis
2010 Johann-Heinrich-Merck-Preis
2019 Cross of Honour for Science and Art, First Class, Austrian Decoration for Science and Art
2022 Leipzig Book Award for European Understanding

Bibliography 
 Im Wald der Metropolen, Zsolnay Verlag 2010, Vienna 
 Zu früh, zu spät, Zsolnay Verlag 2007, Vienna 
 Die versprengten Deutschen. Unterwegs in Litauen, durch die Zips und am Schwarzen Meer. Paul Zsolnay Verlag, Vienna 2005 
 Wirtshausgespräche in der Erweiterungszone. Otto Müller Verlag, Salzburg 2005 
 Die Hundeesser von Svinia. Paul Zsolnay Verlag, Vienna 2004 
 Von nah, von fern. Ein Jahresbuch. Paul Zsolnay Verlag, Vienna 2003 
 Mit mir, ohne mich. Ein Journal. Paul Zsolnay Verlag, Vienna 2002 
 Die sterbenden Europäer. Unterwegs zu den Sepharden von Sarajevo, Gottscheer Deutschen, Arbëreshe, Sorben und Aromunen. Paul Zsolnay Verlag, Vienna 2001 
 Der Mann, der ins Gefrierfach wollte. Albumblätter. Paul Zsolnay Verlag, Vienna 1999 
 Ins unentdeckte Österreich. Nachrufe und Attacken. Paul Zsolnay Verlag, Vienna 1998 
 Das europäische Alphabet. Paul Zsolnay Verlag, Vienna 1997 
 Ritter, Tod und Teufel. Essay. Wieser Verlag, Klagenfurt 1994 
 Die Vernichtung Mitteleuropas. Essays. Wieser Verlag, Klagenfurt 1991 
 Der wohlwollende Despot. Über die Staatsschattengewächse – Essay. Wieser Verlag, Klagenfurt 1989 
 Tinte ist bitter. Literarische Porträts aus Barbaropa – Essays. Wieser Verlag, Klagenfurt 1988 
 Wann endet die Nacht. Über Albert Ehrenstein – ein Essay. Edition Moderne, Zurich 1986

References

External links 
 Publisher Otto Müller Verlag, Salzburg
 Publisher Wieser Verlag, Klagenfurt
 Publisher Paul Zsolnay Verlag, Vienna
 Literary Award: Georg Dehio-Buchpreis 2006

Austrian essayists
Writers from Salzburg
1954 births
Living people